Dabbevariki Chedu is a 1987 Telugu-language comedy film, produced by S. Ramalingaraju under the Tarakanama Movies banner and directed by Relangi Narasimha Rao. It stars Rajendra Prasad, Chandra Mohan and Seetha, with music composed by Saluri Vasu Rao. It was released on 1 January 1987. The film is the debut of actress Seetha in the Telugu film industry.

Plot
The film begins in a village where a rich landlord Viswanatham (Suthi Veerabhadra Rao) has 3 daughters Devi (Manochitra), Swarna (Sulakshana), Mamatha (Seeta) respectively; and a son Manohar (Eeswar Rao). The first two daughters are got married, elder son-in-law Govardhanam (Sarath Babu) and second Lakshmikanth (Chandra Mohan) are avaricious people who are behind their father-in-law's property for which they falsify him with affection. Here, Viswanatham's brother-in-law (Suthi Velu) whom he calls with various names claims them as deceptive which he denies. Meanwhile, Viswanatham receives a letter from his childhood friend Udaya Bhaskaram that his son is visiting their village. But, unfortunately, he overdue when Vidyasagar (Rajendra Prasad) a journalist lands therein whom they mistake as Udaya Bhaskaram's son and gives hospitality. Currently, Vidyasagar & Mamatha falls in love. After some time, the truth comes forward when Mamatha leaves the house and marries Vidyasagar. Meanwhile, Viswanatham & his brother-in-law move for a pilgrimage and the bus they are traveling meets with a disastrous accident in which Viswanatham dies. Thereafter, his children receive a funny will in which it is written that Viswanatham's fixed deposit amount of 50 lakhs is picked up by the daughter who takes divorce. There onwards, a comic tale when the 3 couples take divorce. At last, it is revealed that Viswanatham is alive and made a play to find out whether his children's affection is true or false. Finally, everyone apologizes to him and the movie ends on a happy note by Viswanatham performing remarriage of his daughters & sons-in-law.

Cast

Rajendra Prasad as Vidyasagar
Chandra Mohan as Lakshmikanth 
Seetha as Mamatha
Sarath Babu as Govardhanam
Dasari Narayana Rao as himself (Guest)
Suthi Veerabhadra Rao as Viswanatham
Suthi Velu as Various Names
Nutan Prasad as Lawyer Dharmalingam
Prabhakar Reddy as Justice Paramahamsa
Raavi Kondala Rao as Govardhanam's Manager
Potti Prasad as Lawyer Nookaraju
Eeswar Rao as Manohar
Mukku Raju as Beggar
Krishna Chaitanya as Bus Conductor
Gadiraju Subba Raju as Client
Sulakshana as Swarna
Deepa as Jayasila
Manochitra as Devi
Padmanabham as Bank Manager
Dubbing Janaki as Dharmalingam's wife
Kalpana Rai as Vidyaratnam

Crew
Art: Somanath, Bhaskara Rao
Choreography: Anthony, Raju, Nambiraju
Lyrics: Acharya Aatreya, C. Narayana Reddy, Kosaraju, Sirivennela Seetharama Sastry
Playback: S. P. Balasubrahmanyam, V. Ramakrishna, Madhavapeddi Ramesh, P. Susheela, Vani Jayaram, S. P. Sailaja
Story: Malladi Venkata Krishna Murthy
Dialogues: Diwakar Babu
Music: Saluri Vasu Rao
Editing: D. Rajagopal
Cinematography: B. Koteswara Rao
Publicity Designer: Lanka Bhaskar
Producer: S. Ramalinga Raju
Screenplay- Director: Relangi Narasimha Rao
Banner: Tharakanama Movies

Soundtrack

Music composed by Saluri Vasu Rao was released through Lahari Music. Lyrics were written by Acharya Aatreya, C. Narayana Reddy, Kosaraju and Sirivennela Seetharama Sastry.

Others
 VCDs and DVDs on - Santosh Video Company, Hyderabad

References

External links

1980s Telugu-language films
Indian comedy films
Films directed by Relangi Narasimha Rao
1987 comedy films
1987 films